Mohamed Abul Hossain Abul (born 29 July 1983), is a Bangladeshi retired professional footballer who played as a midfielder. He spent most of his club career with Abahani Limited Dhaka, where he won the league title four times. Abdul also had a year-long spell with Brothers Union in 2005, and ended up winning the 2005 Federations Cup with them, he returned to Abahani the following season.

International goals

Honours
Abahani Limited Dhaka
Bangladesh Premier League: 2007, 2008–09, 2009–10, 2016
 Independence Gold Cup (Rajshahi): 2005
 Federation Cup: 2010

Brothers Union
 Bangladesh Federation Cup: 2005

References

Living people
1983 births
Bangladeshi footballers
Bangladesh international footballers
Association football midfielders
Footballers from Dhaka
People from Narayanganj District
Abahani Limited (Dhaka) players
Brothers Union players
Bangladesh Football Premier League players